Havre Boucher  is a community in Antigonish County, Nova Scotia, Canada.

Description
The village takes its name from "Havre Boucher", a natural harbour that opens onto St. George's Bay to the north. The community has expanded from its original setting on the west side of the harbour to now encompass the communities of Auld's Cove, Cape Jack, East Havre Boucher, West Havre Boucher, Frankville and Linwood.

Havre Boucher is largely rural and largely dependent upon the fishing industry and as a service centre for the surrounding area.

Formerly an incorporated village, offering its residents political control through an elected governing body known as a "village commission" which operated under the auspices of the Nova Scotia Municipal Services Act, its status was dissolved in 2018.

History
Construction of the Canso Causeway, which opened in 1955, saw the Canadian National Railway mainline from Truro-Sydney being diverted from Linwood to an alignment north through Havre Boucher and Cape Jack, following the Strait of Canso to the causeway. Prior to that time, the railway ran from Linwood to Mulgrave where a ferry service operated to Point Tupper. Havre Boucher saw the construction of a large railway yard, which remains in operation today by the Cape Breton and Central Nova Scotia Railway.

Demographics 

References

External links
Village of Havre Boucher - official website
Havre Boucher in "Place-Names and Places of Nova Scotia"

Communities in Antigonish County, Nova Scotia
Designated places in Nova Scotia